"We are armed with Allahu Akbar" is the name of an Iranian 1979 Islamic revolutionary military march song performed by IRGC troops in front of Ayatollah Khomeini in Jamaran Hussayniya. For more than 3 decades, it has been the credit song for Iranian television news across all channels and hours. The song lyrics are partially composed of parts from Muhammad's speech for the victory of the Conquest of Mecca, saying "There is no deity but God, the one. He has fulfilled His promise, He held to his servant".

Lyrics

References

Further reading 
Live performance of the song in the presence of Ayatollah Khomeini 

Military marches
Iranian patriotic songs